Vaitheeswaran is a 2008 Tamil language film. It starred Sarath Kumar, Meghna Naidu and Pooja Gandhi.

Plot
When a young boy Saravanan is killed by rowdy — and aspiring politician — Dhanasekaran (Sayaji Shinde), his distraught mother (Vinaya Prasad) is ready to kill herself. She is stopped by Mani Shankar (Vijayakumar), who promises her that her son will be reincarnated and meet her 30 years hence. The only condition is that the mother must remain inside Vaitheeswaran temple, praying to be reunited with her son. 30 years later, her wait catches the attention of the public, who are curious to see if Saravanan shows up. Dr. Bala (Sarathkumar), who has no belief in reincarnation, wishes to treat her while Dhanasekharan, who is now a politician and eyeing the CM seat, knows that Saravanan's arrival could derail his plans. Armed with a computer-generated photo of how Saravanan would look like now,  Dhanasekharan and Bala go looking for him, when Bala realises that he is indeed the reincarnation of Saravanan. What happens next forms the climax of the story.

Cast

 Sarath Kumar as Saravanan / Dr. Bala
 Meghna Naidu as Roopa
 Pooja Gandhi as Sanjana a Journalist
 Sayaji Shinde as Dhanasekaran
 Vijayakumar as Mani Shankar
 Riyaz Khan as AC Shakthi
 Suja Varunee as Dr. Sharmila
 Santhanam as Madan
 Mayilsamy
 Vinaya Prasad as Saravanan's Mother
 Manobala as Dhanasekaran's Henchman
 Chitra Lakshmanan as Dhanasekaran's Henchman
 Thyagu
 Poovilangu Mohan
 Ponnambalam
 Munnar Ramesh as Kasi
 Delhi Ganesh
 Mohan Raman

Soundtrack

Critical reception
Sify wrote "The trouble with Vaitheeswaran is that it is predictable, story is stale and there are no twists in the tale". Rediff wrote "Everything is connected'. That's the tagline of Annamalai Production's latest, Tamil film Vaitheeswaran starring action star Sarathkumar, and directed by R K Vidhayadharan. You only wish the team had managed to connect the screenplay, acting and plot all together!". Behindwoods wrote "The pre-interval session of the film proceeds linearly on track, but the first twenty minutes post interval is a little grueling for the audience. However, the film picks up momentum soon after. Reincarnation is a widely debated issue, evincing varied opinions. But this aspect has been discussed in the film back and forth and the director's apprehension on which side to fall is clearly evident."

References

2008 films
Films about reincarnation
2000s Tamil-language films
Films scored by Srikanth Deva